Stokesdale is a town in the northwestern corner of Guilford County, and the southwestern section of Rockingham County, North Carolina, United States. The population was 3,267 at the 2000 census. As of the 2010 census, the population had risen to 5,047. Belews Lake is located nearby, and North Carolina Highway 68 and North Carolina Highway 65 both intersect U.S. Route 158 near the town's center.

Geography
Stokesdale is located at  (36.236371, -79.982393).

Demographics

2020 census

As of the 2020 United States census, there were 5,924 people, 1,837 households, and 1,439 families residing in the town.

2010 census
As of the census of 2010, there were 5,047 people, 1,201 households, and 962 families residing in the town. The population density was 168.5 people per square mile (65.1/km). There were 1,268 housing units at an average density of 65.4 per square mile (25.3/km). The racial makeup of the town was 90.69% White, 6.95% African American, 0.31% Native American, 0.67% Asian, 0.46% from other races, and 0.92% from two or more races. Hispanic or Latino of any race were 1.93% of the population.

There were 1,201 households, out of which 38.3% had children under the age of 18 living with them, 68.9% were married couples living together, 7.7% had a female householder with no husband present, and 19.9% were non-families. 16.5% of all households were made up of individuals, and 8.7% had someone living alone who was 65 years of age or older. The average household size was 2.67 and the average family size was 2.99.

In the town, the population was spread out, with 26.2% under the age of 18, 5.7% from 18 to 24, 33.7% from 25 to 44, 21.2% from 45 to 64, and 13.3% who were 65 years of age or older. The median age was 38 years. For every 100 females, there were 97.9 males. For every 100 females age 18 and over, there were 94.1 males.

The median income for a household in the town was $51,484, and the median income for a family was $58,185. Males had a median income of $37,167 versus $28,875 for females. The per capita income for the town was $22,548. About 5.2% of families and 5.3% of the population were below the poverty line, including 5.7% of those under age 18 and 12.9% of those age 65 or over.

Education
Stokesdale is home to Stokesdale Elementary School, which serves as the primary school for Pre-K to fifth grade students in the town. Students in Stokesdale continue to attend Northwest Guilford Middle School and Northwest Guilford High School, located to the south in Greensboro. All three schools have Vikings as their mascot and school colors of red, black and white.

References

External links
 Town of Stokesdale
 The Stokesdale News (local newspaper)
 Stokesdale Parks and Recreation, Inc.

]

Towns in Guilford County, North Carolina
Towns in North Carolina